Sleeper is a double album by Keith Jarrett's "European Quartet" recorded on April 16, 1979 in Tokyo. It was released on ECM Records 33 years later, in 2012, as ECM 2290/2291.

April 1979 Tour in Japan 
Sleeper was recorded in Japan during a tour in which, according to www.keithjarrett.org, Jarrett's "European Quartet" performed 13 times in 20 days. Below is the list of the dates and venues:

 2 - Kosei Nenkin Hall, Tokyo
 4 - Civic Hall, Fukuoka
 5 - Yubin-Chokin Hall, Hiroshima
 6 - Kosei Nenkin Hall, Osaka
 9 - International House, Kobe
 10 - Kaikan Hall 1, Kyoto
 12 - Aichi Auditorium, Nagoya
 13 - Kosei Nenkin Hall, Tokyo
 16 - Nakano Sun Plaza, Tokyo
 17 - Nakano Sun Plaza, Tokyo
 18 - Hokkaido Kosei Nenkin Hall, Sapporo
 20 - Kanagawa Kenmin Hall, Yokohama
 21 - Prefectural Culture Center, Ibaraki

Some of the music played in Tokyo (different dates other than April 16) is collected in the album Personal Mountains

Reception 

In a review for AllMusic, Christian Genzel wrote: "As a companion piece to the live albums Nude Ants and Personal Mountains..., Sleeper offers another noteworthy document of the creative interplay between these four musicians." John Kelman, writing for All About Jazz, called the quartet a "very special and unforgettable group", and commented: "If Sleeper accomplishes any single thing, beyond being a stellar performance from a group that has rightfully, in the ensuing years, become legendary— and remains a touchstone for many musicians, young and old, decades after the fact— it's that this two-disc, 107-minute recording is a reminder of just how compelling a composer Jarrett can be.

Writing for The Guardian, John Fordham called the album "enthralling", and stated: "'Personal Mountains' is a 20-minute tour de force of shifting harmonies and chord-punching Latin grooving. 'Innocence' drifts in freefall until it becomes a softly swaying love song. 'So Tender' has the shape of a standard ballad... but then loosens. 'Oasis' sounds like an Ornette Coleman lament, and 'New Dance' is probably as close as any of these performers came to playing a mainstream jazz-calypso like Sonny Rollins' famous version of 'Don't Stop the Carnival'. There's lots of free-improv, too, but the range of this remarkable group played a big part in its enduring influence on contemporary jazz."

In an article for Between Sound and Space, Tyran Grillo wrote: "If ever it were possible for a recording to be even more alive than the day it was laid down, this is it—such is the value of its release. In addition to the symbiotic rhythm section, Garbarek naysayers may find themselves knocked on their rears by the exuberant, life-affirming themes issuing from his bell, each fitting snugly in Jarrett's pianistic relief. A classic before it ever hit the shelves, Sleeper may just be the ECM event of the year and is, as its title implies, a dream to hear at long last."

Track listing
All compositions by Keith Jarrett
CD 1
"Personal Mountains" - 21:12
"Innocence" - 10:47
"So Tender" - 13:27

CD 2
"Oasis" - 28:13
"Chant of the Soil" - 14:52
"Prism" - 11:15
"New Dance" - 	7:07

Personnel 
 Keith Jarrett - piano, percussion
 Jan Garbarek - tenor and soprano saxophones, flute, percussion
 Palle Danielsson - double bass
 Jon Christensen - drums, percussion

Production
 Manfred Eicher - producer
 Jan Erik Kongshaug - recording engineer
 Terje Mosnes - photos
 Sascha Kleis - design
 Toshinari Koinuma - concert production

References 

2012 live albums
ECM Records live albums
Keith Jarrett live albums
Jan Garbarek live albums
Albums produced by Manfred Eicher
Albums recorded at Nakano Sun Plaza